Asian Highway 43 (AH43) is a  route of the Asian Highway Network, running  from Asian Highway 1 in Agra, India to Matara in Sri Lanka.

Route
It passes through Indian cities of Agra (AH1), Gwalior (AH47), Sagar, Nagpur (AH46), Hyderabad Chikkaballapur and Bangalore (AH45, AH47), Madurai.  The road briefly ends at Rameswaram before starting in Sri Lanka at Talaimannar and passes through Mannar, Anuradhapura, Dambulla (AH44), Kurunegala, Kandy, Colombo, Galle and Matara.

India

The route shares some portions of various Indian National Highways. The route passes through Indian states of Uttar Pradesh, Rajasthan, Madhya Pradesh, Maharashtra, Telangana, Andhra Pradesh, Karnataka, and Tamil Nadu.
  Agra to Madurai
  Madurai to Tiruppuvanam
  Tiruppuvanam to Dhanushkodi

Sri Lanka
The route shares portions of the following Sri Lankan highways:
 
 
 
 
 , The  serves as an alternate route for the AH43 on the  portion.
 , The  serves as an alternate route for the AH43 on the  portion. Currently all these roads bear the national highways route signs, but have not yet been installed with AH43 route signs.

Junctions
India
  Agra
  Gwalior
  Nagpur
  Bangalore
  Krishnagiri
Sri Lanka
  at Dambulla

See also
 List of Asian Highways
 International E-road network
 Trans-African Highway network

References

External links
  Treaty on Asian Highways with routes

Asian Highway Network
Roads in India
Highways in Sri Lanka